The ideal gas law, also called the general gas equation, is the equation of state of a hypothetical ideal gas. It is a good approximation of the behavior of many gases under many conditions, although it has several limitations. It was first stated by Benoît Paul Émile Clapeyron in 1834 as a combination of the empirical Boyle's law, Charles's law, Avogadro's law, and Gay-Lussac's law. The ideal gas law is often written in an empirical form:

It can also be derived from the microscopic kinetic theory, as was achieved (apparently independently) by August Krönig in 1856 and Rudolf Clausius in 1857.

Equation

The state of an amount of gas is determined by its pressure, volume, and temperature. The modern form of the equation relates these simply in two main forms. The temperature used in the equation of state is an absolute temperature: the appropriate SI unit is the kelvin.

Common forms

The most frequently introduced forms are:where:
  is the absolute pressure of the gas,
  is the volume of the gas,
  is the amount of substance of gas (also known as number of moles),
  is the ideal, or universal, gas constant, equal to the product of the Boltzmann constant and the Avogadro constant,
  is the Boltzmann constant,
  is the Avogadro constant,
  is the absolute temperature of the gas,
  is the number of particles (usually atoms or molecules) of the gas.

In SI units, p is measured in pascals, V is measured in cubic metres, n is measured in moles, and T in kelvins (the Kelvin scale is a shifted Celsius scale, where 0.00 K = −273.15 °C, the lowest possible temperature). R has for value 8.314 J/(mol·K) = 1.989 ≈ 2 cal/(mol·K), or 0.0821 L⋅atm/(mol⋅K).

Molar form
How much gas is present could be specified by giving the mass instead of the chemical amount of gas. Therefore, an alternative form of the ideal gas law may be useful. The chemical amount, n (in moles), is equal to total mass of the gas (m) (in kilograms) divided by the molar mass, M (in kilograms per mole):
 
By replacing n with m/M and subsequently introducing density ρ = m/V, we get:
 
 
 
Defining the specific gas constant Rspecific(r) as the ratio R/M,
 
This form of the ideal gas law is very useful because it links pressure, density, and temperature in a unique formula independent of the quantity of the considered gas.  Alternatively, the law may be written in terms of the specific volume v, the reciprocal of density, as
 

In any case, the context and/or units of the gas constant should make it clear as to whether the universal or specific gas constant is being used.

Statistical mechanics
In statistical mechanics the following molecular equation is derived from first principles

 

 

where  is the Avogadro constant.

From this we notice that for a gas of mass , with an average particle mass of  times the atomic mass constant, (i.e., the mass is  u) the number of molecules will be given by

 

and since , we find that the ideal gas law can be rewritten as

 

Combined gas law

When comparing the same substance under two different sets of conditions, the law can be written as

Energy associated with a gas 
According to the assumptions of the kinetic theory of ideal gases, one can consider that there are no intermolecular attractions between the molecules, or atoms, of an ideal gas. In other words, its potential energy is zero. Hence, all the energy possessed by the gas is the kinetic energy of the molecules, or atoms, of the gas.

 

This corresponds to the kinetic energy of n moles of a monoatomic gas having 3 degrees of freedom; x, y, z. The table here below gives this relationship for different amounts of a monoatomic gas.

Applications to thermodynamic processes 
The table below essentially simplifies the ideal gas equation for a particular processes, thus making this equation easier to solve using numerical methods.

A thermodynamic process is defined as a system that moves from state 1 to state 2, where the state number is denoted by subscript. As shown in the first column of the table, basic thermodynamic processes are defined such that one of the gas properties (P, V, T, S, or H) is constant throughout the process.

For a given thermodynamics process, in order to specify the extent of a particular process, one of the properties ratios (which are listed under the column labeled "known ratio") must be specified (either directly or indirectly). Also, the property for which the ratio is known must be distinct from the property held constant in the previous column (otherwise the ratio would be unity, and not enough information would be available to simplify the gas law equation).

In the final three columns, the properties (p, V, or T) at state 2 can be calculated from the properties at state 1 using the equations listed.

 a. In an isentropic process, system entropy (S) is constant. Under these conditions, p1V1γ = p2V2γ, where γ is defined as the heat capacity ratio, which is constant for a calorifically perfect gas. The value used for γ is typically 1.4 for diatomic gases like nitrogen (N2) and oxygen (O2), (and air, which is 99% diatomic). Also γ is typically 1.6 for mono atomic gases like the noble gases helium (He), and argon (Ar). In internal combustion engines γ varies between 1.35 and 1.15, depending on constitution gases and temperature.

 b. In an isenthalpic process, system enthalpy (H) is constant. In the case of free expansion for an ideal gas, there are no molecular interactions, and the temperature remains constant.  For real gasses, the molecules do interact via attraction or repulsion depending on temperature and pressure, and heating or cooling does occur.  This is known as the Joule–Thomson effect.  For reference, the Joule–Thomson coefficient μJT for air at room temperature and sea level is 0.22 °C/bar.

Deviations from ideal behavior of real gases
The equation of state given here (PV = nRT) applies only to an ideal gas, or as an approximation to a real gas that behaves sufficiently like an ideal gas. There are in fact many different forms of the equation of state. Since the ideal gas law neglects both molecular size and intermolecular attractions, it is most accurate for monatomic gases at high temperatures and low pressures. The neglect of molecular size becomes less important for lower densities, i.e. for larger volumes at lower pressures, because the average distance between adjacent molecules becomes much larger than the molecular size. The relative importance of intermolecular attractions diminishes with increasing thermal kinetic energy, i.e., with increasing temperatures. More detailed equations of state, such as the van der Waals equation, account for deviations from ideality caused by molecular size and intermolecular forces.

Derivations

Empirical
The empirical laws that led to the derivation of the ideal gas law were discovered with experiments that changed only 2 state variables of the gas and kept every other one constant.

All the possible gas laws that could have been discovered with this kind of setup are:
 Boyle's law 
 Charles's law 
 Avogadro's law 
 Gay-Lussac's law 
  
  

where P stands for pressure, V for volume, N for number of particles in the gas and T for temperature; where  are constants in this context because of each equation requiring only the parameters explicitly noted in them changing.

To derive the ideal gas law one does not need to know all 6 formulas, one can just know 3 and with those derive the rest or just one more to be able to get the ideal gas law, which needs 4.

Since each formula only holds when only the state variables involved in said formula change while the others (which are a property of the gas but are not explicitly noted in said formula) remain constant, we cannot simply use algebra and directly combine them all. This is why:  Boyle did his experiments while keeping N and T constant and this must be taken into account (in this same way, every experiment kept some parameter as constant and this must be taken into account for the derivation).

Keeping this in mind, to carry the derivation on correctly, one must imagine the gas being altered by one process at a time (as it was done in the experiments). The derivation using 4 formulas can look like this:

at first the gas has parameters 

Say, starting to change only pressure and volume, according to Boyle's law, then:

After this process, the gas has parameters 

Using then equation to change the number of particles in the gas and the temperature,

After this process, the gas has parameters 

Using then equation to change the pressure and the number of particles,

After this process, the gas has parameters 

Using then Charles's law (equation 2) to change the volume and temperature of the gas,

After this process, the gas has parameters 

Using simple algebra on equations,, and  yields the result:
 or  where  stands for the Boltzmann constant.

Another equivalent result, using the fact that , where n is the number of moles in the gas and R is the universal gas constant, is:
 which is known as the ideal gas law.

If three of the six equations are known, it may be possible to derive the remaining three using the same method. However, because each formula has two variables, this is possible only for certain groups of three. For example, if you were to have equations, and  you would not be able to get any more because combining any two of them will only give you the third.

where the numbers represent the gas laws numbered above.

If you were to use the same method used above on 2 of the 3 laws on the vertices of one triangle that has a "O" inside it, you would get the third.

For example:

Change only pressure and volume first:

then only volume and temperature:

combining equations and  yields , which is equation, of which we had no prior knowledge until this derivation.

Theoretical

Kinetic theory

The ideal gas law can also be derived from first principles using the kinetic theory of gases, in which several simplifying assumptions are made, chief among which are that the molecules, or atoms, of the gas are point masses, possessing mass but no significant volume, and undergo only elastic collisions with each other and the sides of the container in which both linear momentum and kinetic energy are conserved.

The fundamental assumptions of the kinetic theory of gases imply that

and  denotes the Boltzmann constant. The root-mean-square speed can be calculated by

Using the integration formula

it follows that

from which we get the ideal gas law:

Statistical mechanics

Let q = (qx, qy, qz) and p = (px, py, pz) denote the position vector and momentum vector of a particle of an ideal gas, respectively. Let F denote the net force on that particle. Then the time-averaged kinetic energy of the particle is:
 
where the first equality is Newton's second law, and the second line uses Hamilton's equations and the equipartition theorem. Summing over a system of N particles yields

By Newton's third law and the ideal gas assumption, the net force of the system is the force applied by the walls of the container, and this force is given by the pressure P of the gas. Hence

where dS is the infinitesimal area element along the walls of the container. Since the divergence of the position vector q is

the divergence theorem implies that

where dV is an infinitesimal volume within the container and V is the total volume of the container.

Putting these equalities together yields

which immediately implies the ideal gas law for N particles:

where n = N/NA is the number of moles of gas and R = NAkB is the gas constant.

Other dimensions 
For a d-dimensional system, the ideal gas pressure is:

where  is the volume of the d-dimensional domain in which the gas exists. Note that the dimensions of the pressure changes with dimensionality.

See also

 
 
 
 Gas laws

References

Further reading

External links 
 
 Configuration integral (statistical mechanics) where an alternative statistical mechanics derivation of the ideal-gas law, using the relationship between the Helmholtz free energy and the partition function, but without using the equipartition theorem, is provided. Vu-Quoc, L., Configuration integral (statistical mechanics), 2008. this wiki site is down; see this article in the web archive on 2012 April 28.
 Gas equations in detail

Gas laws
Ideal gas
Equations of state
1834 introductions